Fast & Furious: Showdown is a racing video game developed by Firebrand Games. It was published by Activision for Xbox 360, PlayStation 3, Wii U, Nintendo 3DS, and Microsoft Windows. The game is based on Fast & Furious series, and bridges the story between the movies Fast Five and Fast & Furious 6.

Plot 
The player takes control of many of the major Fast & Furious series characters, except for the noticeably absent Dominic Toretto.

The story begins with a cut scene featuring Monica Fuentes finding Riley Hicks digging around through files in her office. Riley introduces herself and states she is going to meet Luke Hobbs in 24 hours, and needs to know everything Hobbs has been up to. The missions are then events told by Monica to explain what Hobbs had been dealing with. Through this, various events from the movies, like the safe dragging scene from Fast Five, or the hijacking scene from Fast & Furious are presented.

Gameplay 
The gameplay of Fast & Furious: Showdown focuses on cooperative driving and car combat. The game is centered around different missions, all centered around driving around in semi-destructible loops. These missions can range from a normal race to surviving a certain number of laps. In some missions, the character may need to hijack another vehicle by jumping from the top of their vehicle to the other. All the cars have health bars, and some feature nitro abilities.

The game can be played with an AI partner or in local cooperative play. There is no online gameplay. The gameplay varies from having two separate cars, to one person manning the turret while the other drives, to one person jumping out of the car and hijacking the other.

As you progress through the game you unlock concept art , movie stills and mods, which are limited to three slots per car, and can be used to assist the player during missions. For example, to increase health, acceleration, top speed and have unlimited ammo. (Mods are only available in select missions and playlists in the 3ds version)

Reception 

Fast & Furious: Showdown received negative reviews from critics. IGN editor Marty Sliva said that the game "seemed to actively try to persuade me to stop playing before I reached the finish line." Alex V from New Game Network was less hard on the game and said that "Fast and Furious: Showdown should only be of interest to the casual gamers who enjoy the films."

References 

Fast & Furious video games
2013 video games
Activision games
Organized crime video games
Video games developed in the United Kingdom
Video games set in Moscow
Video games set in Brazil
Video games set in Los Angeles
Video games set in Mexico
Video games set in Argentina
Video games set in Germany
Video games set in Russia
Video games set in Hong Kong
Xbox 360 games
PlayStation 3 games
Windows games
Nintendo 3DS games
Wii U games
Multiplayer and single-player video games
Firebrand Games games